Pavlivka is an urban-type settlement in Dovzhansk Raion of Luhansk Oblast in eastern Ukraine. Population:

Demographics
Native language distribution as of the Ukrainian Census of 2001:
 Ukrainian: 60.91%
 Russian: 38.20%
 Others 0.89%

References

Urban-type settlements in Dovzhansk Raion